Confederation of the Greens (CV) was a Spanish party alliance in the European Parliament election in 1987.

Member parties
Green Alternative–Ecologist Movement of Catalonia (AV–MEC)
The Alternative Greens (LVA)
Ecologist Party of the Basque Country (PEE)
Ecologist Alternative of Galicia (AEG)
Natural Culture (CN)

References

Defunct political party alliances in Spain
Green political parties